Primal Rage is a 1988 Italian-American science fiction horror film directed by Vittorio Rambaldi.

Plot
Frank Duffy, a reporter for a local newspaper in Miami, sneaks into a research laboratory that carries out experiments on animals. Bitten by a rabid monkey, the young man falls prey to an uncontrollable fury and spreads the infection in the nearby college, where the carefree Halloween party taking place there turns into a bloodbath.

Cast
Patrick Lowe as Sam Nash
Cheryl Arutt as Lauren Daly
Sarah Buxton as Debbie
Bo Svenson as Ethridge
Mitch Watson as Frank Duffy
Doug Sloan as Lovejoy
Luis Valderrama as Chas
John Baldwin as Bryan
Turk Harley as Prof. Jenkins
Jennifer Hingel as Kimberly
Barry D. Schreiber as Oakley
Paul Bridges Thompson as Lab Assistant
Sally Carlson as Nurse
Greg Schmidt as Sam's Roommate
Mal Jones as Janitor
Kristine Loyd as Babe
Tom Kouchalakos as Rookie Cop
Brody Howell as Drunk Student
Earl Lee Simpson III as Baby Huey
Ben Stotes as Vampire
Joe Del Campo as FBI Agent
Christopher David Brown as FBI Agent
Eileen Engel as Dorm Receptionist
Julian Byrd as University Vice President
Jack McDermott as Police Chief
Darlene Wheatley as Editor
J. D. Steel as Tow Truck Driver
Tom Boykin as Fratter
R. Emmett Fitzsimmons as Campus Cop
L. R. Dutchyshyn as Cop at Halloween Party
William Cagliostro as Infirmary Student
Jay Amor as Orderly
Bill Wohtmann as Veteran Cop

Production
The film was directed by Vittorio Rambaldi (in his directing debut), the son of Italian special effects artist Carlo Rambaldi.

The film was written by Umberto Lenzi and James Justice. Lenzi would later recall that he was approached with two scripts, saying that "One was fucking awful and one wasn't bad." Lenzi "took the one [he] liked the most", "about a female scientist that has an accident in her lab and becomes genetically mutated, transforming into a tiger", and rewrote it, but by the time he arrived at the United States, he found that his backers wanted him to film the other script, which became Nightmare Beach (also known as Welcome to Spring Break). The script that Lenzi worked on, which he described as a homage to Cat People, was eventually further rewritten by Justice, and the final script that was shot was credited to "Harry Kirkpatrick", an alias Justice also used in Nightmare Beach, in which he also worked on.

The film's poster art was made by Renato Casaro.

Reception
Joseph A. Ziemba and Dan Budnik in their book Bleeding Skull!: A 1980s Trash-Horror Odyssey of the film, "Primal Rage borrows the plot and general sense of chaos from George Romero's The Crazies, gives it a shot of Cro-Magnon idiocy, and adds a "Avoid the Noid!" poster, an A.L.F. stuffed animal, and a relentless z-rate metal soundtrack. Leapfrogging over mundane hilarity (padding that involves racquetball), squirm-inducing gore (eyes ripped out) and the savoir fare of the late 80s (skull costumes from The Karate Kid), Primal Rage does not ask much from its audience. All we have to do is keep our eyes open."

The film was also covered on RedLetterMedia's Best of the Worst series, in the 2021 Halloween episode.

References

External links
 

1988 horror films
English-language Italian films
1980s science fiction horror films
American science fiction horror films
Italian science fiction horror films
Films about viral outbreaks
1980s English-language films
Films set in Miami
1980s Italian films